The Association of Personal Computer User Groups (APCUG) is a worldwide organization that helps computer user groups by facilitating communications between APCUG member groups, computer hardware and software makers, and hardware and software vendors. A non-profit corporation as designated by the U.S. Internal Revenue Service, APCUG also helps member groups and their officers fulfill their education goals with support materials and shared knowledge and experience.

While a large number of member groups in APCUG are oriented towards the Microsoft DOS and Windows operating systems, many member groups have SIGs (Special Interest Groups), Forums, Classes, etc. for Apple and Android devices as well as the Linux OS and Chromebooks. Membership is open to all technology user groups.

APCUG itself is not a user group; only user groups/clubs themselves are members. APCUG services are offered to group leaders and members.

History

APCUG began after a series of meetings and discussions between representatives from various user groups around the country about improving communications between groups and sharing information. The presidents from three user groups—Boston Computer Society, Capital PC User Group, and Houston Area League of PC Users—organized the First Annual User Group Summit meeting at the 1986 Fall Comdex.

After that first Summit meeting and subsequent meetings, the leaders of 15 user groups met in Seattle in October 1987 and proposed the formation of an association for the purpose of fostering communication among and between user groups. That proposal was presented before 130 representatives from 50 user groups at the Second Annual User Group Summit Meeting in November 1987 and was unanimously approved.

Products and services

APCUG offers many benefits to its member groups, including:
 Speakers Bureau featuring over 100 presentations in 20+ categories that Speaker Bureau presenters can give to groups via interactive webinars
 Quarterly Virtual Technology Conferences (VTC) each with six different presentations to enhance members’ tech knowledge or ideas for running their group
 VTC videos that can be used for group presentations
 PUSH tech articles sent to editors to use in their newsletters
 Quarterly Reports newsletter with region reports that let member groups know what other groups are doing; ideas for running member groups, etc.

APCUG2.org contains information about:
 APCUG
 Board of Directors
 Board of Advisors
 History
 FAQs
 Committees
 Contact Us
 Windows, Apple, Linux and Chromebook tips 
 Member Benefits
 How to find a speaker/presentation
 Virtual Technology Conferences
 Sponsor News
 Member Group News 
 Discounts and Special Offers
 Contests
 Membership / Renewal

External links
 APCUG website

User groups